Nagda - Bina Passenger or Bina - Ratlam Passenger is a Passenger express train of the Indian Railways connecting Nagda Junction in Madhya Pradesh and Bina Junction in Madhya Pradesh. It is currently being operated with 53229/53230 train numbers on daily basis.

Service 

It averages 36 km/hr as 59341 Nagda Bina Passenger starts from Nagda Junction covers 429 km in 11 hrs 50 mins & at 39 km/hr as 53230 Bina - Ratlam Passenger starts from  Bina Junction and covers  471 km in 12 hrs and ends it journey at Ratlam Junction.

Route and halts 

The important halts of the Nagda - Bina Passenger are :

 
 
 
 
 
 
 
 

The important halts of the Bina - Ratlam Passenger are :

Traction

Both trains are hauled by a Ratlam Diesel Loco Shed based WDM-3A diesel locomotive.

See also 

 Ujjain Junction railway station
 Ratlam Junction railway station
 Bina Junction railway station
 Nagda Junction railway station

References

External links 
59341/Nagda Bina Passenger (UnReserved)
59342/Bina - Ratlam Passenger ( Via Nagda ) (UnReserved)

Rail transport in Madhya Pradesh
Transport in Ratlam
Slow and fast passenger trains in India